Thiotricha amphixysta is a moth of the family Gelechiidae. It was described by Edward Meyrick in 1929. It is found in Assam, India.

The wingspan is 12–13 mm. The forewings are shining white with a narrow fuscous or dark fuscous dorsal streak from the base to the tornus, followed by one
or two elongate marks or dashes resting on the lower part of the termen. There is a narrow dark fuscous costal streak from beyond the middle to the apex, cut by an oblique white strigula towards the apex. There is also a black apical dot. The hindwings are pale greyish subhyaline (almost glass like).

References

Moths described in 1929
Thiotricha
Taxa named by Edward Meyrick